The Tahamí were a Colombian indigenous people who inhabited the Antioquia region between the Porce and Magdalena rivers. Many municipalities such as Carmen de Viboral, Rionegro, Marinilla, Segovia, Amalfi, El Peñol, Yolombó, Cisneros, and Guarne are claimed to be first inhabited by these people.

Indigenous peoples in Colombia
Circum-Caribbean tribes